The 1938 Vermont Catamounts football team was an American football team that represented  the University of Vermont as an independent during the 1938 college football season. In their fifth year under head coach John P. Sabo, the team compiled a 4–2–1 record. Their season opening game against  was canceled due to poor travel conditions between Hartford and Burlington.

Schedule

References

Vermont
Vermont Catamounts football seasons
Vermont Catamounts football